The 2018–19 Lebanese FA Cup was the 47th edition of the national football cup competition of Lebanon. It started with the First Round on 12 October 2018 and concluded with the final on 25 May 2019.  

Defending champions Ahed beat Ansar in the final to win their second consecutive Lebanese FA Cup, their sixth in total. The winner qualified for the 2020 AFC Cup play-off round; however, as Ahed also won the Lebanese Premier League, the AFC Cup spot went to second-placed Ansar.

Teams

First phase

First round

Second round

Second phase

Round of 16

Quarter-finals

Semi-finals

Final

Bracket
The following is the bracket which the Lebanese FA Cup resembled. Numbers in parentheses next to the score represents the results of a penalty shoot-out.

Top scorers 
Only Second Phase matches are taken into consideration.

Notes

References

External links
LFA official website

Lebanese FA Cup seasons
FA Cup
Lebanon